Christopher Orr (born ) is a former professional rugby league footballer who played as a  or  in the 1990s. He played at representative level for Scotland, and at club level for the Gold Coast Chargers and the Huddersfield Giants.

International honours
Chris Orr won caps for Scotland while at the Huddersfield Giants 1998 2-caps.

References

1973 births
Gold Coast Chargers players
Huddersfield Giants players
Living people
Place of birth missing (living people)
Scotland national rugby league team players
Rugby league five-eighths
Rugby league halfbacks